Nicholas Sperlyng (fl. 1388–1402), of Wycombe, Buckinghamshire, was an English politician.

He was a Member (MP) of the Parliament of England for Wycombe in 1402. He was Mayor of Wycombe in 1388–1390 and 1397–98.

References

14th-century births
15th-century deaths
English MPs 1402
Mayors of places in Buckinghamshire
People from Buckinghamshire